The 8th World Championships in Athletics, under the auspices of the International Association of Athletics Federations, were held at Commonwealth Stadium in Edmonton, Alberta, Canada between 3 August and 12 August and was the first time the event had visited North America. The music for the Opening and Closing Ceremonies was composed by Canadian composers Jan Randall and Cassius Khan. The ceremonies also featured a 1000 voice choir, and the Edmonton Symphony Orchestra.

Edmonton defeated bids from Paris, France (which hosted the next edition) and the San Francisco Bay Area in the United States to host the event.

Men's results

Track
1997 | 1999 | 2001 | 2003 | 2005

Note: * Indicates athletes who ran in preliminary rounds.
1 Ali Saïdi-Sief of Algeria originally finished second in the 5000 m in 13:02.16, but he was disqualified after he tested positive for nandrolone. 
2 Tim Montgomery (USA) originally came second in the men's 100 meters in 9.85, but he was disqualified in 2005 after he admitted to drug use as a result of the BALCO scandal.
3 The USA originally finished first in 37.96 (Mickey Grimes, Bernard Williams, Dennis Mitchell, Tim Montgomery), but they were disqualified in 2005 after Tim Montgomery admitted to drug use as a result of the BALCO scandal. 
4 The United States (Leonard Byrd, Antonio Pettigrew, Derrick Brew, Angelo Taylor) originally finished first in 2:57.54, but were disqualified in 2008 after Antonio Pettigrew admitted to using HGH and EPO between 1997 and 2003.

Field
1997 | 1999 | 2001 | 2003 | 2005 | 2007

Women's results

Track
1997 | 1999 | 2001 | 2003 | 2005

Note: * Indicates athletes who ran in preliminary rounds.
1 Kelli White originally finished third in the 200 m in 22.56, but she was disqualified in 2004 after she admitted to using steroids as a result of the BALCO doping scandal.

2Marion Jones (USA) finished second in the 100m in 10.85 and first in the 200m in 22.39, but she was disqualified in 2005 after she admitted to using steroids as a result of the BALCO doping scandal.

3 The USA team of Kelli White, Chryste Gaines, Inger Miller, and Marion Jones originally finished first in a time of 41.71, but were disqualified in 2004 after Kelli White admitted to using steroids as a result of the BALCO doping scandal.

Field
1997 | 1999 | 2001 | 2003 | 2005 | 2007

1Natalya Sadova of Russia originally won the gold medal in discus throw (68.57), but she was later disqualified after she tested positive for caffeine.

Medal table
Note that the host, Canada, did not win any medals at these championships.  This fate Canada shares only with Sweden (1995).

See also
2001 in athletics (track and field)

References

 2001 IAAF World Championships in Athletics – Official website

 
World Athletics Championships
World Championships in Athletics
Sports competitions in Edmonton
World Championships
International track and field competitions hosted by Canada
World Championships in Athletics
World Championships in Athletics
2000s in Edmonton